If the Cap Fits is an Irish television sketch show that aired on RTÉ for one series in 1973. The show was written by and starred Niall Tóibín.

References

1973 Irish television series debuts
1970s Irish television series
Irish television sketch shows
RTÉ original programming